William Michael Vogel (November 16, 1931 – February 1, 2019) was a Canadian politician who served as Mayor of Surrey, British Columbia from 1978 to 1980. He previously served as an alderman on Surrey City Council from 1973 to 1977. Prior to his death he lived in Langley, British Columbia and was a former pilot. His father, Hunter Vogel was a businessman and founder/owner of the Cloverdale Paint company. His father was also a former mayor of Langley, as well as a member of the British Columbia Legislature. Vogel died in Langley, British Columbia on February 1, 2019, at the age of 87.

References

1931 births
2019 deaths
Canadian people of Danish descent
Mayors of Surrey, British Columbia
People from Burnaby
Surrey, British Columbia city councillors